Clavigesta purdeyi, the pine leaf-mining moth, is a moth of the family Tortricidae. It is found in Belgium, the Netherlands , the United Kingdom and Ireland.

The wingspan is 10–12 mm The forewing is reddish brown with narrow, grey cross-bands. 

The imago is on wing from July to September.

The larvae mine the needles of Pinus sylvestris, Pinus contorta var. latifolia and Pinus nigra var. maritima and do not enter the buds or shoots. Trees show signs of defoliation and eventually shoots may die.

External links
 Eurasian Tortricidae
 UKmoths
 Lepidoptera of Belgium

Olethreutinae
Moths described in 1911
Tortricidae of Europe